The fourth series of the British medical drama television series Holby City commenced airing in the United Kingdom on BBC One on 9 October 2001, and concluded on 1 October 2002. The episode run for this series was actually commissioned for 26 episodes, however a further 26 episodes were given the go ahead and were bolted onto the end of Series 4 resulting in a 52-episode series run. In essence, it is a combination of two separate series, but classed as one. From here on, each series was commissioned as a full 52-episode run.

Reception
In 2002, the BBC was condemned by critics who felt that the network "no longer believed it had a duty to shape public taste." David Cox of the New Statesman commented that this became clear during the 2001 Christmas schedule, when BBC One scheduled Holby City against a contemporary version of Othello. On this basis, Cox advocated the abolition of the licence fee, explaining: "The BBC was invented in a period when the elite decided what the population should know. If that has gone, then the licence fee should go too."

Cast

Main characters 
Ian Aspinall as Mubbs Hussein (from episode 8)
Luisa Bradshaw-White as Lisa Fox (from episode 13)
Colette Brown as Sam Kennedy (until episode 45)
Peter de Jersey as Steve Waring
Jeremy Edwards as Danny Shaughnessy
Tina Hobley as Chrissie Williams
George Irving as Anton Meyer (until episode 46)

Dominic Jephcott as Alistair Taylor (episodes 1−46)
Verona Joseph as Jess Griffin (from episode 15)
Denis Lawson as Tom Campbell-Gore (from episode 45)

Rocky Marshall as Ed Keating (from episode 45)
Mark Moraghan as Owen Davis (from episode 3)
Anna Mountford as Keri McGrath (until episode 41)
David Paisley as Ben Saunders (from episode 17)
Jan Pearson as Kath Shaughnessy
Patricia Potter as Diane Lloyd (from episode 39)
Hugh Quarshie as Ric Griffin (from episode 1)
Siobhan Redmond as Janice Taylor (until episode 44)
Laura Sadler as Sandy Harper
Jeremy Sheffield as Alex Adams

Recurring characters 
Andrew Dunn as Simon Shaughnessy (episodes 8−52)
Ian Kelsey as Patrick Spiller (episode 11)
Martin Ledworth as Father Michael (episodes 8-33)
Ana Sofrenovic as Marija Ovcar (episodes 1–16)
Kulvinder Ghir as Anil Banerjee
Tilly Blackwood as Emma Waring (until episode 10)
Marvin Humes as Robbie Waring
David Soul as Alan Fletcher (episode 27)
Denise Welch as Pam McGrath (episodes 36–41)
Jan Anderson as Chloe Hill (episode 1)
Hari Dhillon as Sunil Gupta
Deborah Poplett as Anna Chandler 
Christopher Colquhoun as Simon Kaminski (episode 43)
Christine Stephen-Daly as Lara Stone (episodes 28 and 31)
Zita Sattar as Anna Paul (episode 28)

Episodes

References

External links
"Design for Living" shooting script at BBC Writers Room

04
2001 British television seasons
2002 British television seasons